Gian Luigi Gessa is a professor of Neuropsychopharmacology at the University of Cagliari, where he has led for a long time the Department of Neurosciences. He is the leader of the Italian group that studies drug addiction. He also directed the research groups of the National Research Council.

He worked as a researcher at the National Institutes of Health by Bethesda (Maryland) led by Professor Bernard Brodie and Scripps Research Institute of La Jolla (California), before returning to Italy and becoming one of the most authoritative experts in neuropharmacological research.

Under his leadership, the Department of Neuroscience of University of Cagliari was ranked twenty-third place in the world among research institutes in the field of Pharmacology (Xenobiotics, Current Contents, Life Sciences, 1993). The Neuropharmacology department of Cagliari was also recognized by the Ministry of University and Scientific Research as a "Center of Excellence" for research on the Neurobiology of Addiction.

Professor Gessa is also head of the CICAP Sardinia and a member of the Scientific Committee of "Journal of Psychiatry" located at University of Rome "La Sapienza". He also served as president of the Italian Society of Pharmacology (SIF). He is currently professor emeritus of pharmacology at the University of Cagliari and an associate member of the Institute of Neurosciences of the National Research Council.

He received the  Camillo Golgi Award from Accademia Nazionale dei Lincei for his research.

In 2004, he decided to join politics, by standing with the list of Renato Soru Project Sardinia as a regional councilor, being elected with 4613 preferences.

From June 2, 2006 he is Grand Officer of Order of Merit of the Republic.

Works

Author
Endorphines(1987),Pythagora Press.
Psychopharmachology(1990),Collana manuali di medicina,Masson.
Dopamine and Mental Depression (1990),Paperback.
Dysthymia: Diagnosis and Treatment (1998),Mediserve.
Interview on neuroscience (2003),CUEC.
Cocaine (2008),Rubbettino.

Publisher 
Depression and Mania: From Neurobiology to Treatment (Advances in Biochemical Psychopharmacology)(1995), New York City:Raven Press

Articles and studies 
 Marked inhibition of mesolimbic dopamine release: a common feature of ethanol, morphine, cocaine and amphetamine abstinence in rats..(1992), European Journal of Pharmacology
Mesolimbic dopaminergic decline after cannabinoid withdrawal.(1998) National Academy of Sciences, U.S.
Self-administration of the cannabinoid receptor agonist WIN 55,212-2 in drug-naive mice. (1998) Neuroscience
Investigation on the relationship between cannabinoid CB1 and opioid receptors in gastrointestinal motility in mice (2004) British Journal of Pharmacology
 Prenatal exposure to a cannabinoid receptor agonist does not affect sensorimotor gating in rats.(2006), European Journal of Pharmacology
'' Efficacy of rimonabant and other cannabinoid CB1 receptor antagonists in reducing food intake and body weight: preclinical and clinical data.(2006), CNS Drug Review

External links

On the appointment as Grand Officer
La biochimica della dipendenza -   The biochemistry of addiction - Article by Professor Gessa on Tempo Medico
A scientific opinion on the law Fini-Giovanardi
 Gian Luigi Gessa and his relationship with Sardinia
Interview with Professor Gessa  on the issue of dangerousness of recreational drugs, particularly canapa

Living people
1932 births
Italian neuroscientists
Pharmaceutical scientists
Academic staff of the University of Cagliari
National Research Council (Italy) people